Enteromius caudosignatus is a species of ray-finned fish in the genus Enteromius, it occurs at only one known location in the Congo Basin of Angola.

References
 

Endemic fauna of Angola
Enteromius
Taxa named by Max Poll
Fish described in 1967